The Cordillera Oriental (Spanish for eastern mountain range) is the eastern part of the Andes in Peru. This range contains Paleozoic metamorphic rocks.

It includes many subsidiary ranges such as the Vilcanota, Vilcabamba, Urubamba and Carabaya mountain ranges and peaks above 6,000 m such as Salcantay.

The highest peak is Nevado Ausangate at 6372 m.

See also

 Cordillera Central (Peru)

References

Mountain ranges of the Andes
Mountain ranges of Peru
Mountain ranges of Cusco Region
Mountain ranges of Puno Region